Blödite or bloedite is a hydrated sodium magnesium sulfate mineral with formula: Na2Mg(SO4)2·4H2O.  The mineral is clear to yellow in color often darkened by inclusions and forms monoclinic crystals.

Blödite was first described in 1821 for an occurrence in a salt deposit in Ischler Salzberg, Bad Ischl, Gmunden, Austria and named for German mineralogist and chemist Karl August Blöde (1773–1820).

It is found worldwide in evaporitic sedimentary environments such as the Great Salt Lake, Utah.

See also
List of minerals
List of minerals named after people

References

Sodium minerals
Magnesium minerals
Sulfate minerals
Monoclinic minerals
Minerals in space group 14
Evaporite